The 2001 NCAA National Collegiate Women's Ice Hockey Tournament involved four schools playing in single-elimination play to determine the national champion of women's NCAA Division I college ice hockey. The 2001 tournament was the first women's ice hockey tournament to be sponsored by the NCAA.  The tournament began on March 23, 2001, and ended with the championship game on March 25.

Qualifying teams
The at-large bids, along with the seeding for each team in the tournament, were announced on Sunday, March 18.

Brackets

Frozen Four – Minneapolis, Minnesota

All-Tournament Team
G: Tuula Puputti, Minnesota–Duluth
D: Isabelle Chartrand, St. Lawrence
D: Brittny Ralph, Minnesota-Duluth
F: Amanda Sargeant, St. Lawrence
F: Maria Rooth, Minnesota–Duluth*
F: Tammy Lee Shewchuk, Harvard
* Most Outstanding Player(s)

References

External links
NCAA Women's Ice Hockey - NCAA.com

NCAA Women's Ice Hockey Tournament
Ice hockey competitions in Minneapolis
 
NCAA National Collegiate Women's Ice Hockey Tournament
2000s in Minneapolis
NCAA National Collegiate Women's Ice Hockey Tournament